The 2019 International Champions Cup Women's Tournament was a tournament of friendly women's association football matches. It was the second edition of the Women's International Champions Cup and took place in Cary, North Carolina, United States, from August 15 to 18, 2019.

The tournament was hosted by the defending champions, the North Carolina Courage of the National Women's Soccer League, at the 10,000-seater Sahlen's Stadium. They were joined by UEFA Women's Champions League winners Olympique Lyonnais Féminin of France, English FA Women's League Cup winners Manchester City, and Spanish Primera División winners Atlético Madrid Femenino. The matches were organized into two doubleheaders, with the semifinals played on August 15 and the final and third-place match on August 18. For the first time, there was a cash prize awarded to the winning team, paid for by new sponsor Budweiser. The tournament was also broadcast on ESPN.

The final, played on August 18, was a rematch between North Carolina and Lyon. Lyon won 1–0 in front of 8,208 fans.

Teams
Four teams participated in the tournament.

Venue

Bracket

Matches

Semi-finals

Third place play-off

Final

See also
2019 International Champions Cup
International Women's Club Championship

References

External links

2019 Women
2019 in women's association football
2019 in American women's soccer
2019 in sports in North Carolina
Soccer in North Carolina
August 2019 sports events in the United States